Nevio Devide (born 2 December 1966) is an Italian manager and a former professional tennis player from Italy.

Biography

Tennis career
Devidè, a right-handed player, was born in Saronno and based out of Solaro. Playing on the professional tour in the late 1980s, he won four Challenger titles, all in doubles. He competed in several Grand Prix doubles tournaments, most notably at Bordeaux in 1987, where he and partner Bernhard Pils were semi-finalists. In singles his best performance was a runner-up finish at the 1989 Modena Challenger, with wins over Cristiano Caratti, Bruce Derlin and Menno Oosting.

Management activities
Devidè now works in the sport marketing industry. After working in the field of sporting events, and having been in Media Partners (now Infront Sport), he takes on the role of the Marketing Director for the 2006 Winter Olympics's organising committee. After this experience he assumes the role of CEO and CFO of a leading company in the field of information technologies solutions within the government’s intelligence sector. Now he is the Marketing, Licensing and Events Director for the  Milano Cortina 2026 Olympic and Paralympic Winter Games Organising Committee

Challenger titles

Doubles: (4)

References

External links
 
 

1966 births
Living people
Italian male tennis players
Sportspeople from the Province of Varese
People from Saronno